Oued Melliz is a town and commune in the Jendouba Governorate in Tunisia. In 2004, it had a population of 2188.

See also
List of cities in Tunisia

References

Populated places in Jendouba Governorate
Communes of Tunisia